Abacetus laevigatus is a species of ground beetle in the subfamily Pterostichinae. It was described by Straneo in 1960.

References

laevigatus
Beetles described in 1960